Kaitlin Statz is an American science fiction and horror writer and podcaster, publishing works as K. A. Statz. She is known for her work on the podcasts - The White Vault, VAST Horizon, Liberty, and Dark Dice.

Career and works

Podcasting career
Statz started creating fiction podcasts with Travis Vengroff in 2015, with the premiere of the audio drama series Liberty: Critical Research. Statz co-founded Fool & Scholar Productions with Vengroff. The duo were Parsec Awards finalists in 2016 under the category of 'Best New Speculative Fiction Team', and Critical Research was an Audio Verse Award finalist in 2016 for writing and acting. Later the same year, Statz and Vengroff expanded the Liberty podcast to include Tales from the Tower, an anthology horror series set in the same world as the other Liberty stories.

In October 2017, Statz created the found footage horror fiction audio drama The White Vault. The ongoing podcast has been critical perceptions. It has been listed on the top 10 charts for The Arts and Performing Arts on iTunes, on the top 50 chart for ‘All of iTunes’ in the US. The White Vault has won 2018 Mark Time Award, two Webby Honorees, and twenty-three Audio Verse Awards. In addition to the core show, Statz created and wrote multiple White Vault miniseries including Artifact, Imperial, Iluka, and Avrum.

In 2018 Statz & Vengroff released Liberty: Vigilance, a play audio drama podcast which was featured by personalities of Wayne June from Darkest Dungeon, Ashly Burch, Sainty & Eric Nelsen, Dave Fennoy, Lani Minella, and George Lowe.

In late 2018, the duo also released Dark Dice, a horror actual play podcast, which was featured on various iTunes Top 10 charts for the US, UK, and Canada. Additionally, Statz also won the Audio Drama Hub (ADPP) Scriptwriting Competition, and her work ‘’Selling Ledford Manor’’ was performed in front of a live audience in London.

In 2019, Statz premiered VAST Horizon, a science fiction audio drama featuring strong female protagonists and no narration. VAST Horizon has received critical praise for its sound design and writing, winning 7 Audio Verse Awards, and a 2020 W3 Silver Award. Statz is one of the founding members of the Audio Drama Coalition, the founding member of the Audio Drama Roundtable, a member of the Audio Drama Hub. Statz has given lectures and panels at New York Comic Con, The Austin Film Festival, Podfest, Podtales, Podcon, and Emerald City Comic Con. Statz became a full time podcaster in 2019.

Written works
Statz was a contributor to the Russian magazine Mir Fantastiki from 2016-2018, interviewing artists and covering events for film and television. Statz has also released a number of supplemental Liberty stories and books.

Awards and honors

References

External links
 

American women writers
American women podcasters
American podcasters
Living people
Alumni of the University of Oxford
21st-century American women writers
American science fiction writers
Women science fiction and fantasy writers
Year of birth missing (living people)